Zuo is a Chinese surname. It is the 187th name listed on the Hundred Family Surnames poem.

People
Zuo Zongtang (左宗棠) (1812-1885), a Qing dynasty Han Chinese General, the inspiration for General Tso's chicken
Zuo Baogui (左寶貴) (1837–1894), a Qing dynasty Hui Chinese General, from Shandong province, died in action during the First Sino-Japanese War in Pyongyang in Korea from Japanese artillery in 1894 while securing the city. A memorial to him was constructed.
 Zhang Zuo (pianist) (左章) (born 1988)
 Zuo Xiaoqing (Chinese: 左小青; born 25 June 1977) is a Chinese actress, TV presenter and former rhythmic gymnast.[1]

See also

List of common Chinese surnames

References

Chinese-language surnames
Individual Chinese surnames